Morocco will be scheduled to compete in the 2020 Summer Paralympics in Tokyo, Japan from 25 August to 6 September 2021. Morocco will be hosting the first African Para Games in January 2020 which will act as a Games qualifier in some sports.

Medalists

Medals by sport

Medals by date

Medals by gender

Competitors
Source:

Athletics

Twelve Moroccan athletes have automatically qualified in athletics in the World Para Athletics Marathon Championships

Men's track

Women's track

Women's field

Cycling

Football 5-a-side

Morocco have qualified after winning the 2019 Africa Regional Championships held in Enugu, Nigeria.

Group stage

Semi-finals

Bronze medal match

Powerlifting

Taekwondo

Morocco qualified three athletes to compete at the Paralympics competition. Two of them qualified by winning the gold medal at the 2020 African Qualification Tournament in Rabat, while the other qualified by finishing top six in world ranking.

Tennis

Morocco qualified two player entries for wheelchair tennis. Both qualified under the bipartite commission invitation allocation quota.

See also
 Morocco at the Paralympics
 Morocco at the 2020 Summer Olympics

References

Nations at the 2020 Summer Paralympics
2020
2021 in Moroccan sport